Ausmultiplikation (literally, "multiplying-out") is a German term used by the composer Karlheinz Stockhausen to describe a technique in which a long note is replaced by shorter "melodic configurations, internally animated around central tones", resembling the ornamental technique of divisions (also called "diminutions") in Renaissance music. Stockhausen first described this technique in connection with his "opus 1", Kontra-Punkte, composed in 1952–53, but in his later formula composition there is a related method of substituting a complete or partial formula for a single very long tone in a much slower, "more background" projection of the formula. When this is done at more than one level, the result is reminiscent of a fractal.

Notes and references
Notes

References

Sources
 
 
 

Post-tonal music theory
Musical techniques